There are fourteen counties in the U.S. state of Vermont. These counties together contain 255 political units, or places, including 237 towns, 9 cities, 5 unincorporated areas, and 4 gores. Each county has a county seat, often referred to as a "shire town."

In 1779, Vermont had two counties. The western side of the state was Bennington County and the eastern was Cumberland County. In 1781, three new counties (including then-called Washington that became part of New Hampshire) were created out of Cumberland County, and the remainder of the county was renamed Windham.
Today's Washington County was created in 1810 as Jefferson County; it was renamed Washington in 1814.

Essex County, Orleans County, and Caledonia County are commonly referred to as the Northeast Kingdom.

The FIPS county code is the five-digit Federal Information Processing Standard (FIPS) code which uniquely identifies counties and county equivalents in the United States. The three-digit number is unique to each individual county within a state, but to be unique within the entire United States, it must be prefixed by the state code. This means that, for example, while Addison County, Vermont is 001, Belknap County, New Hampshire and Alachua County, Florida are also 001. To uniquely identify Addison County, Vermont, one must use the state code of 50 plus the county code of 001; therefore, the unique nationwide identifier for Addison County, Vermont is 50001. The links in the column FIPS County Code are to the Census Bureau Info page for that county.

List

|}

See also
List of cities in Vermont
List of gores in Vermont
List of towns in Vermont
List of former United States counties

Notes
  There are several sources that state the formation year for Windham County is 1781 and that Cumberland County was dissolved rather than renamed.

References

Vermont, counties in
Counties